Bjørkelangen is a village of 3,196 inhabitants (January 2015 figures)  in the Akershus county of south-eastern Norway. Located immediately north of Lake Bjørkelangen, it became the administrative centre of the Aurskog-Høland municipality in 1966.

The village is home to a primary school, a junior high school, and two senior high schools: Bjørkelangen Videregående Skole, which is a traditional high school offering a broad academic curriculum, and Kjelle Videregående Skole, which focuses on agricultural and forestry education.

Commercial facilities in Bjørkelangen include three grocery stores (Rimi, REMA1000, and COOP Prix) and two petrol stations (Shell and Esso), as well as a number of clothing stores and other retail outlets in close proximity to the main, pedestrianized street.

Gallery

References

Aurskog-Høland
Villages in Akershus